Le Mas is a commune in the Alpes-Maritimes department in the Provence-Alpes-Côte d'Azur region of South-eastern France.

The inhabitants of the commune are known as Massois, Massoises, or Massoinques.

Geography
Le Mas is located some 45 km north-west of Nice and 32 km east of Castellane in a direct line. Access to the commune is by road D10 which branches from the D5 road on the western border of the commune and passes through the length of the commune through the village before continuing to Aiglun in the east. The D110 branches from the D10 in the west of the commune and passes along the river valley to rejoin the D10 east of the village. The commune is alpine in nature with high mountains and alpine valleys throughout.

The Gironde river flows through the commune from west to east to join the Estéron which forms the eastern border of the commune as it flows south then east joining the Var at Saint-Martin-du-Var. Numerous tributaries feed the Gironde in the commune.

Neighbouring communes and villages

History
Isnard, from the House of Grasse, Commander of St. John of Jerusalem, Prior of Capua, Grand Seneschal of Provence, in recognition of his services received the lands of Mas and Aiglun from Queen Jeanne on 7 July 1348. He donated the land of Aiglun to his cousin Pons of Ferres on 18 May 1349. The fief of Mas passed down to Bertrand II de Grasse. The Grasse family lost the lordship of Mas at the time of the separation of Nice and it subsequently remained with the Counts of Provence.

In 1713 the Treaty of Utrecht provided that Ubaye and its dependencies, formerly under the Kingdom of Piedmont-Sardinia, were exchanged for the French areas in the Susa Valley so that the boundary followed the line of the watershed. But the overlapping of territories inherited from history remained: Entraunes and Saint-Martin-d'Entraunes were dependent on Barcelonnette but are in the Var valley while the Piedmontese side upstream of Guillaumes was already French. The Kingdoms of France and Piedmont both claimed them. In addition, in the Estéron Valley the right bank of the Var was Piedmontese which created a tongue of land jutting out into French Provence. In Haut-Var it was ultimately the line of the watershed which prevailed. To provide compensation to France and to reduce the irregularity of the border, the community of Mas was ceded to France in 1718.

For more historical information (in French) click here.

Heraldry

Administration

List of Successive Mayors

Demography
In 2017 the commune had 155 inhabitants.

Culture and heritage

Civil heritage
The remains of a Chateau from the 11th century
A small classical chateau
A Mill to the south of the village
The Arboretum du Sarroudier

Religious heritage

The Church of Notre-Dame (12th century) is registered as an historical monument The Church contains two items that are registered as historical objects:
A Reliquary of Saint Arnoux (16th century)
A Bust-Reliquary of Saint Arnoux (16th century)

Other religious sites of interest
The Chapel of Saint Arnoux
The Chapel of the White Penitents (Now converted to a private residence)
The Chapel of Saint Sebastian (Now private)
The Hamlet of Sausses with the Chapel of Saint Sauveur and the Oratory of Saint Aman

Le Mas Photo Gallery

See also
Communes of the Alpes-Maritimes department

Bibliography
Philippe de Beauchamp, The Misunderstood High Country. Villages & isolated hamlets of Alpes-Maritimes, p. 137, Éditions Serre, Nice, 1989 ; p. 159

External links
Le Mas on Géoportail, National Geographic Institute (IGN) website 
Mas on the 1750 Cassini Map

References

Communes of Alpes-Maritimes